İkizler is a village in the Tercan District, Erzincan Province, Turkey. The village had a population of 17 in 2021.

The hamlets of Bulutlu, Karlık and Recep are attached to the village.

References 

Villages in Tercan District
Kurdish settlements in Erzincan Province